Theodore Olin personal family knowledge (nephew)Thackrey (November 17, 1901 – October 24, 1980) was an American journalist and publisher, best known as the editor of the New York Post in the 1940s, and the founder of the leftist New York City newspaper The Daily Compass.

Biography
Following the demise of the leftist New York City newspaper PM, published from June 1940 to June 22, 1948, and that paper's first successor, the New York Star, published from June 23, 1948, to January 28, 1949, Ted Thackrey founded The Daily Compass. Thackrey had been the features editor of the New York Post before marrying Post owner Dorothy Schiff in 1943, after which the two became co-publishers/co-editors. In 1948, he became solo publisher of the Post at the behest of his wife, leading to a disastrous three-month tenure in which major advertisers dropped the paper and Schiff returned to take over. Thackrey "left with a following of firebrand writers to start his own paper", buying the building and physical plant at which PM and the Star had been published, at Duane Street and Hudson Street in Manhattan. With private financing, he founded The Daily Compass as its publisher and president. The paper began publishing on May 16, 1949, and ceased publication in November 1952.

After The Daily Compass ceased publication, Thackrey joined the public relations firm Ruder Finn. In 1959, Thackrey and Goldstein testified at the U.S. Senate's "Hearings Before the Select Committee in Improper Activities on the Labor or Management Field", which investigated alleged improprieties by the newspaper deliverers union and forcible payoffs in order to ensure Compass distribution.

Family
His son, Ted Thackrey Jr. (1918?–2001), whose stepmother was Dorothy Schiff, later worked as a reporter for The Wichita Eagle in Wichita, Kansas, before joining the Los Angeles Examiner in the 1950s. He went on to the Los Angeles Times in 1968, where he eventually became a rewrite man. He died in July 2001.

References

American newspaper publishers (people)
New York Post people
1901 births
1980 deaths